Ankaragücü Cycling Team was a Turkish professional cycling team, based in Ankara. The team was the men's and women's cycling department of MKE Ankaragücü, a major sports club in Ankara, Turkey. In 2010, Ankaragücü was the only team who had UCI licence by mountainbike discipline. Semra Yetiş was part of the team in 2010.

External links
 Ankaragücü Official Web Page

References

MKE Ankaragücü
Sports teams in Ankara
Defunct cycling teams based in Turkey
Cycling teams based in Turkey
Cycling teams established in 2008
Cycling teams disestablished in 2012